Tace or TACE may refer to:
 Transcatheter arterial chemoembolization, a medical procedure 
 ADAM 17 endopeptidase, an enzyme
 Chlorotrianisene, a synthetic estrogen
 Tamil All Character Encoding - TACE-16